Karasungur is a village in the Pervari District of Siirt Province in Turkey. The village had a population of 856 in 2021. The village is Kurdish.

It is located in the Botan River basin.

History 
The village formerly adhered to the Qadiriyya order but turned to the Naqshbandi order as it spread throughout the region.

References 

Villages in Pervari District
Kurdish settlements in Siirt Province